"Guerrilla Radio" is a song by American rock band Rage Against the Machine and the lead single from their 1999 album The Battle of Los Angeles. It became the band's only Billboard Hot 100 song, charting at #69. The band won the Grammy Award for Best Hard Rock Performance for this song. The song was featured in mountain biking film, “Strength in Numbers”. “Guerrilla Radio" was also featured on the soundtracks for video games such as Tony Hawk's Pro Skater 2, Madden NFL 10 and Guitar Hero Live, as well as being a downloadable track for the Rock Band series.

History
"Guerrilla Radio" was performed live on the Late Show with David Letterman in 1999. During the commercial break, "Bulls on Parade" was played and was re-joined in progress while the credits were playing. Letterman joked that "he hoped they (Rage Against the Machine) weren't neglecting their school work". The performance was controversial due to Zack de la Rocha giving the middle finger on live TV and wearing a "Free Mumia Abu-Jamal" T-shirt.

On January 28, 2000, documentary film maker Michael Moore convinced campaigning politician Alan Keyes to mosh in a truck with young teenagers listening to "Guerrilla Radio". Keyes, who was campaigning for the Republican nomination at the Iowa caucuses, agreed to join in the mosh for the endorsement of Moore's satirical television show, The Awful Truth.

The song was covered by lounge/comedy group Richard Cheese and Lounge Against the Machine, whose band name also spoofs Rage. In April 2007, Alanis Morissette covered it live.

In July 2007, the song's video for "Guerrilla Radio" was ranked #45 on MuchMusic's 50 Most Controversial Videos for extreme amounts of profanity. Though, it appeared in RTPNadverts in the summer of 2006, as an instrumental song.

This song is featured on the album Body of War: Songs that Inspired an Iraq War Veteran.

"Guerrilla Radio" made its live debut on September 11, 1999, at the Oxford Zodiac in England.

The song is one of 31 music files in the Sony BMG v. Tenenbaum case, which resulted in finding the individual file-sharer liable for copyright infringement in July 2009, demanding an award of $22,500 a song.

In December 2009, Guerilla Radio was placed #54 on Channel V's Top 1000 Noughties Music Videos of the decade, Countdown.

"Guerrilla Radio" is played at Los Angeles FC home matches when the team scores a goal. It was also on the soundtrack and opening sequence for the video game Tony Hawk's Pro Skater 2, and returned to the soundtrack when the re-mastered Tony Hawk's Pro Skater 1 + 2 was released in 2020. In Japan, Fuji Television used it as the theme song for its broadcasts of Pride Fighting Championships.

Music video
The promo was shot by production company Squeak Pictures in Los Angeles in October 1999 and directed by Honey, i.e., the husband-and-wife directorial team of Laura Kelly and Nicholas Brooks. The video which, among others, touches upon the exploitation of garment workers, parodies the popular late '90s Gap commercials directed by Pedro Romhanyi. These ads featured attractive young people singing songs while against a white backdrop, wearing Gap clothing. The phrase "everybody in denial" was a play on "everybody in khaki" which was a Gap TV ad campaign at the time.

The video begins with bland, generic, elevator music being played. There are shots of sweatshop workers (UNITE! union members playing themselves) at their tables, against a white backdrop. Shortly, the phrase "everybody in denial" is flashed on screen. The band is then seen standing against a white background, calmly playing their instruments. As the song picks up, pictures are seen of a man putting money from the workers in his pockets, taking a girl away from her mother, and the band playing live in a dark, strobe-lit room.

Track listing
CD single
"Guerrilla Radio"
"Without a Face (Live Version)"

UK limited edition maxi single, part one
"Guerrilla Radio"
"No Shelter"
"The Ghost of Tom Joad"

UK limited edition maxi single, part two
"Guerrilla Radio" (Radio Edit)
"Fuck tha Police" (Live) (N.W.A cover)
"Freedom" (Live)

Charts

Weekly charts

Year-end charts

References

External links
 Axis of Justice Tom Morello and Serj Tankian's Activist Website "Axis Of Justice"

1999 singles
Rage Against the Machine songs
Protest songs
Song recordings produced by Brendan O'Brien (record producer)
Grammy Award for Best Hard Rock Performance
1998 songs
Songs written by Tom Morello
Songs written by Brad Wilk
Songs written by Tim Commerford
Songs written by Zack de la Rocha
Songs against capitalism
Epic Records singles